Stakeholder management is a critical component to the successful delivery of any project, programme or activity. A stakeholder is any individual, group or organization that can affect, be affected by, or perceive itself to be affected by a programme.

Stakeholder management is a four-step process of identifying stakeholders, determining their influence, developing a communication management plan and influencing stakeholders through engagement.

History 
The origin of stakeholder engagement can be traced back to the 1930s. In 1963, the Stanford Research Institute first defined the concept of stakeholder. In 1984, Edward Freeman’s book Strategic Management: A Stakeholder Approach was published. It brought to existence a complete body of knowledge surrounding the ethical management of stakeholders. Soon thereafter, computers were used to facilitate the organizations' engagement with communities and stakeholder analysis. Seven "principles of stakeholder management" are linked with the work of the Clarkson Centre for Business Ethics at the University of Toronto's Rotman School of Management, developed at four conferences held between 1993 and 1998.

Customers 
Within the field of marketing, it is believed that customers are one of the most important stakeholders for managing its long-term value, with a firm's major objective being the management of customer satisfaction.

Organizational stakeholders 
It is well acknowledged that any given organization will have multiple stakeholders including, but not limited to, customers, shareholders, employees, suppliers, and so forth. The concept of effective stakeholder management is of central concern in research domains such as crisis management, impression management, and stakeholder strategy. One of the Clarkson Centre's seven principles notes that managers "should acknowledge the potential conflicts" between their own role as a corporate stakeholders, and the legal and moral responsibilities they hold to act for the interests of all stakeholders".

Stakeholder prioritization 
Stakeholders may be mapped out on a Power/Interest Grid, and classified by their power and interest. Other stakeholder mapping tools are available.

For example, your boss is likely to have high power and influence over your projects and high interest. Your family may have high interest, but are unlikely to have power over it. 

Position on the grid may show actions:

High power, interested people: these are the people you must fully engage and make the greatest efforts to satisfy.
High power, less interested people: put enough work in with these people to keep them satisfied, but not so much that they become bored with your message.
Low power, interested people: keep these people adequately informed, and talk to them to ensure that no major issues are arising. These people can often be very helpful with the detail of your project.
Low power, less interested people: again, monitor these people, but do not bore them with excessive communication.

Stakeholder engagement

Stakeholder management creates positive relationships with stakeholders through the appropriate management of their expectations and agreed objectives. Stakeholder management is a process and control that must be planned and guided by underlying principles. Stakeholder management within businesses, organizations, or projects prepares a strategy using information (or intelligence) gathered during the following common processes.

Aims include:
 Communicate: To ensure intended message is understood and the desired response achieved.
 Consult, early and often: To get the useful information and ideas, ask questions.
 Remember, they are human: Operate with an awareness of human feelings.
 Plan it: Time investment and careful planning against it, has a significant payoff.
 Relationship: Try to engender trust with the stakeholders. 
 Simple but not easy: Show your care. Be empathetic. Listen to the stakeholders.
 Managing risk: Stakeholders can be treated as risk and opportunities that have probabilities and impact.
 Compromise: Compromise across a set of stakeholders' diverging priorities.
 Understand what is success: Explore the value of the project to the stakeholder.
 Take responsibility: Project governance is the key of project success

See also 
Project management
Project stakeholder
Responsibility assignment matrix
Stakeholder analysis
Stakeholder engagement
Stakeholder register
Stakeholder theory

References

Further reading
 
 
 
 
 
 
 
 
 

Business planning